The 2018–19 Mohun Bagan A.C. season is the 129th season of Mohun Bagan A.C. since the club's formation in 1889 and their 12th season in the I-League which is India's top football league.

Sponsors

Players
{|class="wikitable" style="text-align:center; font-size:90%; width:80%;"
|+ Current Squad
|-
!style="background:#7A1024; color:white; text-align:center;"|Squad No.
!style="background:#1A5026; color:white; text-align:center;"|Name
!style="background:#7A1024; color:white; text-align:center;"|Nationality
!style="background:#1A5026; color:white; text-align:center;"|Position
|-
!colspan=5 style="background:#7a1024; color:white; text-align:center;"|Goalkeepers
|-
|1
|Shankar Roy
|
|GK
|-
|22
|Shilton Paul
|
|GK
|-
|31
|Ricardo Cardozo
|
|GK
|-
|—
|Mainak Akuli
|
|GK
|-
!colspan=5 style="background:#1A5026; color:white; text-align:center;"|Defenders
|-
|3
|Kingsley Obumneme (C)
|
|DF
|-

|4
|Dalraj Singh
|
|DF
|-

|5
|Gurjinder Kumar
|
|DF
|-
|14
|Arijit Bagui
|
|DF
|-
|18
|Abhishek Ambekar
|
|DF
|-
|19
|Lalchhawnkima
|
|DF
|-

|28
|Bikramjeet Singh
|
|DF
|-
|37
|Amey Ranawade
|
|DF
|-
!colspan=5 style="background:#7a1024; color:white; text-align:center;"|Midfielders
|-
|7
|Yuta Kinowaki
|
|MF
|-
|8
|Sourav Das
|
|MF
|-
|11
|William Lalnunfela
|
|MF
|-
|15
|Darren Caldeira
|
|MF
|-

|21
|Omar Elhussieny
|
|MF
|-
|23
|Mehtab Hossain
|
|MF
|-

|25
|Tirthankar Sarkar
|
|MF
|-
|26
|Shilton D'Silva
|
|MF
|-
|27
|Pintu Mahata
|
|MF
|-
|33
|Britto PM
|
|MF
|-

|34
|Abhinas Ruidas
|
|MF
|-

|47
|Sheikh Faiaz(on loan from ATK)
|
|MF
|-
|50
|Sony Norde (VC)
|
|MF
|-

|—
|Dipankar Das
|
|MF
|-

|—
|Lalramzauva Khiangte
|
|MF
|-
!colspan=5 style="background:#1A5026; color:white; text-align:center;"|Forwards
|-
|9
|Dipanda Dicka
|
|FW
|-
|10
|Henry Kisekka
|
|FW
|-
|35
|Azharuddin Mallick
|
|FW
|-

Technical staff
{| class="wikitable"
|-
! Position
! Name
|-
| Chief coach
| Khalid Jamil
|-
| Assistant coach
| Naseem Ali
|-
| Goalkeeping coach
| Arpan Dey
|-
| Physical Trainer
| Samiran Nag
|-
| Physiotherapist
| Soumya Bhattacharjee
|-
| Club Doctor
| Dr. Protim Roy
|-
| Team Manager
|

Competitions

Overall
{| class="wikitable" style="text-align:center; width:90%;"
|-
! style="text-align:center;" | Competition
! style="text-align:center;" | First match
! style="text-align:center;" |  Last match
! style="text-align:center;" | Current Position
! style="text-align:center;" | Final Position
|-
|style="text-align:left;"|I-League
| 27 October 2018
| 
| 
| 5th
|-
|style="text-align:left;"|Super Cup
|
|
|
|
|-
|style="text-align:left;"|IFA Shield
| 7 July 2018
| 19 July 2018
| —
|bgcolor=silver|2nd
|-
|style="text-align:left;"|Calcutta Football League
| 4 August 2018
| 18 September 2018
| —
|bgcolor=gold|1st
|-

Overview
{| class="wikitable" style="text-align: center"
|-
!rowspan=2|Competition
!colspan=8|Record
|-
!
!
!
!
!
!
!
!
|-
| I-League

|-
| Super Cup

|-
| CFL

|-
! Total

I-League

Results summary

Results by round

Calcutta Football League

Matches

Calcutta Football League

I-League

Statistics

Goal scorers
{| class="wikitable sortable" style="text-align:center" 
|-
!style="background:#7A1024; color:white; text-align:center;" width=10|
!style="background:#1A5026; color:white; text-align:center;" width=10|
!style="background:#7A1024; color:white; text-align:center;" width=10|
!style="background:#1A5026; color:white; text-align:center;" width=180|Player
!style="background:#7A1024; color:white; text-align:center;" width=60|I-League
!style="background:#1A5026; color:white; text-align:center;" width=80|Super Cup
!style="background:#7A1024; color:white; text-align:center;" width=40|CFL
!style="background:#1A5026; color:white; text-align:center;" width=50|Total
|-
|1||9||FW||align=left| Aser Pierrick Dipanda||5||-||10||15
|-
|2||10||FW||align=left| Henry Kisekka||4||-||6||12
|-
|3||50||MF||align=left| Sony Norde||4||-||-||4
|-
|4||35||FW||align=left| Azharuddin Mallick||1||-||2||3
|-
|rowspan="3"|5||48||DF||align=left| Lalchhawnkima||1||-||1||2
|-
|25||MF||align=left| Tirthankar Sarkar||-||-||2||2
|-
|27||MF||align=left| Pintu Mahata||-||-||2||2
|-

|rowspan="6"|6||18||DF||align=left|Abhishek Ambekar||-||-||1||1
|-

|7||MF||align=left|Yuta Kinowaki||1||-||-||1
|-

|11||MF||align=left| William Lalnunfela||-||-||1||1
|-

|21||MF||align=left|Omar Elhussieny||1||-||-||1
|-

|26||MF||align=left| Shilton D'Silva||-||-||1||1
|-

|33||MF||align=left| Britto PM||-||-||1||1
|- bgcolor="#EFEFEF"
|colspan="4"|Total||17||-||27||44

Disciplinary record
{| class="wikitable sortable" style="text-align:center" 
|-
!style="background:#7A1024; color:white; text-align:center;" width=10; rowspan="2"|
!style="background:#1A5026; color:white; text-align:center;" width=10; rowspan="2"|
!style="background:#7A1024; color:white; text-align:center;" width=10; rowspan="2"|
!style="background:#1A5026; color:white; text-align:center;" width=180; rowspan="2"|Player
!style="background:#7A1024; color:white; text-align:center;" width=60; colspan="3"|I-League
!style="background:#1A5026; color:white; text-align:center;" width=80; colspan="3"|Super Cup
!style="background:#7A1024; color:white; text-align:center;" width=40; colspan="3"|CFL
!style="background:#1A5026; color:white; text-align:center;" width=50; colspan="3"|Total
|-
!!!!!
!!!!!
!!!!!
!!!!!
|-
|1||3||DF||align=left| Kingsley Obumneme
|2||1||0
|||||
|3||0||0
|5||1||0
|-
|2||7||DF||align=left| Yuta Kinowaki
|3||0||0
|||||
|0||0||0
|3||0||0
|-
|3||22||GK||align=left| Shilton Paul
|1||0||0
|||||
|1||0||0
|2||0||0
|-
|4||15||MF||align=left| Darren Caldeira
|2||0||0
|||||
|0||0||0
|2||0||0
|-
|rowspan="2"|5||5||DF||align=left| Gurjinder Kumar
|1||0||0
|||||
|0||0||0
|1||0||0
|-
|18||DF||align=left| Abhishek Ambekar
|1||0||0
|||||
|0||0||0
|1||0||0
|-
|rowspan="2"|6||23||MF||align=left| Mehtab Hossain
|1||0||0
|||||
|0||0||0
|1||0||0
|-
|47||MF||align=left| Sheikh Faiaz
|1||0||0
|||||
|0||0||0
|1||0||0
|-
|7||10||FW||align=left| Henry Kisekka
|1||0||0
|||||
|0||0||0
|1||0||0

References

Mohun Bagan AC seasons